Marius Valinskas (born 4 May 1999) is a Lithuanian professional basketball player for Nevėžis Kėdainiai of the Lithuanian Basketball League (LKL).

Early career
Prior to his professional career, Valinskas played for Kaunas-based Sabonis Basketball Center team, which played in the third-tier RKL. In 2016, he moved to BC Žalgiris-2 of the NKL, where he played for three seasons.

Professional career
On 30 April 2019, Valinskas was loaned to Lietkabelis Panevėžys of the Lithuanian Basketball League (LKL) until the end of the 2018–2019 season. On 21 June 2019, he signed a long-term contract with Lietkabelis. On 23 July 2021, he was released by the club.

On 6 August 2022, Valinskas signed a two-year contract with Nevėžis Kėdainiai of the Lithuanian Basketball League (LKL).

Personal life
Valinskas' older brother, Paulius, is also a professional basketball player who has previously played for Žalgiris Kaunas, as well as internationally in Belgium and Serbia.

References

External links
 Marius Valinskas at proballers.com
 Marius Valinskas at realgm.com
 Marius Valinskas at basketnews.lt

1999 births
Living people
Basketball players from Kaunas
BC Lietkabelis players
BC Nevėžis players
BC Žalgiris-2 players
Lithuanian men's basketball players
Point guards